The Cape Town French School or the François Le Vaillant French School is a French international school in Cape Town, South Africa.

It has two campuses, the primary school, within the former primary school building of Tafelberg Remedial School in Sea Point, and the Lycée Français du Cap, which includes senior high school, in Gardens.

The school was initiated in 1985 by a group of French citizens resident in Cape Town so as to provide a French Curriculum to their children, it was established in 1987 after securing a location. The Sea Point campus opened in 2014 after it received an 18 million South African rand renovation.

As of 2015 about 41% of the students are not French. Of the overall number of students, 25% are South African.

It directly teaches until seconde (first year of lycée), then uses CNED for première (second year of lycée).

References

External links
 Cape Town French School

French
French international schools in South Africa
High schools in South Africa